The Arabici (meaning "Arabians") were a small Christian sect of the 3rd century. The name of their founder is lost to history. St. Augustine labelled them "Arabici" in the belief that this sect flourished in Arabia. Other sources referred to them occasionally as Thnetopcychitae or Thanatopsychitae (meaning "(believers in) the death of the soul").

The Arabici believed the soul was to perish with the body, though both soul and body would be revived again on Judgement Day. The Arabici theorized this from their study of I Tim., vi, 16, "Who only hath immortality." This passage, they held, ascribes immortality to God alone, and therefore prevents its possession by man. The Arabici's estrangement from the main body of the Church only lasted approximately 40 years. At a council in 250 AD, the Arabici were reconciled to the Church, through the persuasive mediation of Origen.

References 

Christian denominations established in the 3rd century
Nature of Jesus Christ